Marcus Lambkin (born 1971) better known by the pseudonym Shit Robot is an Irish electronic musician and DJ.

Career
While working as a DJ in New York in 2000 he befriended James Murphy, later of LCD Soundsystem, and started a DJ partnership with him. Lambkin moved to rural Germany in 2004 and started producing his own music, with a number of releases on DFA Records from 2006. He released his debut album From the Cradle to the Rave in September 2010 to positive reviews from Entertainment.ie and NME. The album features contributions from Alexis Taylor of Hot Chip and James Murphy amongst others.

Discography

Albums
From the Cradle to the Rave (DFA Records, 2010)
We Got a Love (DFA Records, 2014)
What Follows  (DFA Records, 2016)

Singles
'Wrong Galaxy' (DFA Records, 2006)
'Chasm' (DFA Records, 2007)
'Simple Things (Work It Out)' (DFA Records, 2009)
'I Got A Feeling' (DFA Records, 2010)
'Take Em Up'  (DFA Records, 2010)
'Tuff Enuff'  (DFA Records, 2010)
'Losing My Patience'  (DFA Records, 2011)
'Teenage Bass'  (DFA Records, 2012)
'Feels Real'  (DFA Records, 2013)
'We Got a Love'  (DFA Records, 2013)
'Do That Dance'  (DFA Records, 2014)
'Do It (Right)'  (DFA Records, 2014)
'Where It's At'  (DFA Records, 2015)
'OB-8'  (DFA Records, 2016)
'Cubed / Rotation' (DFA Records, 2018)

References

External links

 Shit Robot portrait robot in Brain magazine

Irish electronic musicians
Irish dance musicians
Irish house musicians
Musicians from Dublin (city)
DFA Records artists
1971 births
Living people